Udhauli (उधौली) is a festival of the Kirat communities of Kirati people specially celebrated by Sunuwar, Limbu, Yakkha,  Khambu Rai etc. of Nepal India and around the world by Kirati People and it is celebrated every year marking the migration phase downwards towards the low-elevation regions when the winter season arrives. The migration from the low-elevation areas upwards to hilly areas is called Ubhauli (upwards), which is also an annual festival of these communities On the Udhauli festival day, the Kirat people offer thanks to mother nature for providing a good harvest.

Udhauli festival is celebrated by all Kirat people. It is believed that from this day the winter season starts. So people, birds, and animals migrate from cold regions to warmer regions. It's mainly celebrated in the eastern region of Nepal by dancing an exotic dance called Sakela or commonly known as Chandi. The dance is very popular in Nepal and is performed by dancing harmoniously in a circle with the beat of Dhol/drum, Jhyamta/cymbals etc. 

The main destinations for the Sakela are Dharan, Dhankuta, Pathari, Kanepokhari, Kerabari etc. This event of the Kirat people has also been stated in the Mundhum (holy book of the Kirat people).

See also
 Sakela
 Chasok Tangnam

References

Festivals in Nepal
Public holidays in Nepal
Nepalese culture
Religious festivals in Nepal
December observances